Corymbia hendersonii, commonly known as Henderson's bloodwood, is a species of tree that is endemic to Queensland. It has rough, tessellated bark on the trunk and branches, lance-shaped adult leaves, flower buds in groups of seven, creamy white flowers and urn-shaped to barrel-shaped fruit.

Description
It has rough, tessellated bark on the trunk and branches. Flowering occurs from January to March and the flowers are creamy white.

Taxonomy and naming
Corymbia hendersonii was first formally described in 1995 by Ken Hill and Lawrie Johnson from specimens collected by R.J. Henderon and others on the Blackdown Tableland in 1971. The specific epithet (hendersonii) honours the collector of the type specimens.

Distribution and habitat
This eucalypt grows with others, usually on rocky slopes and ridges on the Blackdown Tableland, the Carnarvon Range west of Rockhampton and south the Cracow.

Conservation status
Henderson's bloodwood is listed as of "least concern" under the Queensland Government Nature Conservation Act 1992.

References

hendersonii
Myrtales of Australia
Flora of Queensland
Plants described in 1995